vnmr is software for controlling nuclear magnetic resonance spectrometers. It is produced by Varian, Inc.

The software runs on SPARC machines with Solaris. It is composed of a command line interpreter window, an output window, and a status window.

The successor of vnmr is called vnmrJ.

Buttons
There are a number of buttons to perform specific tasks.
 Acqi gives access to other menus :
 insertion of the sample in the NMR machine
 setting up of the lock
 setting up of the shims

Command line interpreter

Main commands:
 jexp1 : join experiment 1
 go : start an acquisition
 wft : Weighted Fourier Transform 
 svf : save file, saved files get a ".fid" extension
 lf : list files
 movetof : move time offset
 pwd : show current directory
 res : give resolution values of a peak
 abc : automatic baseline correction

Beginning with "d" are a number of commands for displaying things:
 dscale : display scale bar
 dg: display parameters
 dpf: display peak frequency
 dpir: display peak integrals
 ...

Integration :
 ins =, integration surface (ins=100 for percentage, ins=9 for an integration on 9 protons)
 dpirn = display partial integral normalized

See also 
 Comparison of NMR software

External links
 Vnmr on NMR wiki

Command-line software
Nuclear magnetic resonance software
Solaris software